The Nile and the Life (Egyptian Arabic: النيل والحياة translit: Al Nil wal Hayah) is a 1968 Egyptian-Soviet film starring Salah Zulfikar and directed by Youssef Chahine.

Plot 
The film painted a picture of Egyptian society, as well as Soviet workers upon embarking on the dangerous project of building the High Dam. The film presents a vision of a nation deeply rooted in unity, as well as diversity.  The film also presents a vision of a renewed image of the Egyptian nation, and inadvertently acknowledges a new understanding of its political goals and objectives, and how this affects the person within it.

Production 
In 1964, the Egyptian General Corporation for Cinema and Television had commissioned director Youssef Chahine to direct a huge colorful film glorifying the project of building the High Dam, but after the filming of the first film (The Nile and the Life) was finished in 1968, the General Film Organization rejected it, as opposed to the Russian side. The film was not shown in Egypt or abroad until the year 1999, when the film was later shown in France and was admired by the French audience and eventually shown in Egypt as well and earned critical recognition.

Main cast 

 Salah Zulfikar
 Igor Vladimirov
 Emad Hamdy
 Madiha Salem
 Valeria Ivashkov
 Vladimir Ivashov
 Valentina Khoutsenko
 Saif Abdul Rahman
 Abdul Majeed Barraqa
 Tawfiq Al-Daqn
 Zouzou Mady
 Youri Kamerny
 Svetalna Igoun
 Hassan Mustafa
 Mushira Ismail
 Mohamed Morched
 Mabrouka

References

External links 
 The Nile and the Life on elCinema

1968 films
Egyptian drama films
20th-century Egyptian films
Films shot in Egypt
Films directed by Youssef Chahine